The 1895 New South Wales colonial election was held on 24 July 1895 for all of the 125 seats in the 17th New South Wales Legislative Assembly and it was conducted in single-member constituencies with a first past the post voting system. Section 23 (1) of the Parliamentary Electorates and Elections Act of 1893 conferred a right to vote on 'every male person, being a natural born [British] subject, who shall have resided or had his principal place of abode in New South Wales for a continuous period of one year'.  males. The 16th parliament of New South Wales was dissolved on 5 July 1895 by the Governor, Lord Hampden, on the advice of the Premier, George Reid.

Key dates

Results

{{Australian elections/Title row
| table style = float:right;clear:right;margin-left:1em;
| title        = New South Wales colonial election, 24 July 1895
| house        = Legislative Assembly
| series       = New South Wales colonial election
| back         = 1894
| forward      = 1898
| enrolled     = 253,125
| total_votes  = 151,680
| turnout %    = 59.92
| turnout chg  = −18.64
| informal     = 1,354
| informal %   = 0.88
| informal chg = −0.74
}}

|}

Retiring members

Changing seats

Notes

References

See also
 Candidates of the 1895 New South Wales colonial election
 Members of the New South Wales Legislative Assembly, 1895–1898

Elections in New South Wales
1895 elections in Australia
1890s in New South Wales
July 1895 events